The Longana is a legendary aquatic creature of the feminine gender. The Longana appear in legends of the people of Cadore, Italy. According to the legend, these creatures live in groups, either in coves or near cliffs.

They are similar to legends like that of the Faun as they have inferior limbs of goats. They are also depicted as intelligent and beautiful women, and they regularly converse with spirits, which explains their extraordinary knowledge of natural events.

One myth tells how one of the Longana women had decided to intermix with a man, and they eventually married each other, only on the condition that the man had to totally forget the woman's origins. Eventually, the couple prosper as the woman had somehow interfered with their farming work and had made their grain aplenty. She had children and, as a result, men started calling the woman names, so she ran away leaving her husband and her children.

Italian legendary creatures
Female legendary creatures 
Mythological aquatic creatures
Water spirits

pl:Longana
ru:Лонгана